Bomane is a village on the Aruwimi River in the Tshopo province of the Democratic Republic of the Congo.

Bomane was among the posts founded in 1889–1890 by a Belgian expedition led by Léon Roget.
Jules Alexandre Milz was placed in charge.

Notes

Sources

Populated places in Tshopo